John Scherer is an American former long-distance runner who ran professionally for Nike and collegiately for the Michigan Wolverines, where he was a two time NCAA Division I champion in the 10000 meter outdoor, and one-time champ in the 5000 meter indoor. Additionally, he competed in the 1992 U.S. Olympic trials and qualified for the finals in the 5000 meter.

Collegiate

Professional 
Scherer competed professionally from 1989 to 1996, winning a total of $9,065 in prize money. He ran for Nike, and was a finalist in the 1992 U.S. Olympic trials despite tendinitis which cut his weekly mileage in half and kept him out of the 10000 meter.

Major competition

Domestic competition

International competition

References

Living people
1966 births
American male long-distance runners
Michigan Wolverines men's track and field athletes
Place of birth missing (living people)